Juan Carlos Tolosa (born in Córdoba, 2 October 1966) is an Argentinian composer, pianist, and conductor.

Studies
Juan Carlos Tolosa began his musical studies in 1972 at Instituto Domingo Zípoli in Córdoba, where he received a degree as choir master. After dropping law, he entered the National University of Córdoba to pursue a career as a composer from 1986 to 1989. In 1989, he left for Europe and settled in Brussels. He studied at the Brussels Conservatory, where he received composition prizes in the classes of Paul-Baudouin Michel and Daniel Capelletti for orchestration, forms, harmony, and musical theory. At the same time, between 1990 and 1998, he regularly attended the Ars musica contemporary music festival composition seminars and workshops, with the participation of Luciano Berio, Witold Lutosławski, György Ligeti, Pierre Boulez, Karlheinz Stockhausen, Brian Ferneyhough, Pascal Dusapin, Iannis Xenakis, Magnus Lindberg, Luca Francesconi, and Wolfgang Rihm.

European career
Tolosa created Black Jackets Company in 1995 together with Pierre Kolp, Francis Ubertelli, and David Nuñezañez, and later the Black Jackets Ensemble in 1996. His music has been performed in several countries, such as Argentina, Venezuela, Chile, Japan, Luxemburg, Spain, Belgium, and Germany, within prestigious festivals such as Ars musica (Belgium) or the Pontificia Universidad Católica de Chile contemporary music festival.

Along with his pure music and musical theatre works, Tolosa has collaborated with the choreographers Marian Del Valle (Spain), Barbara Manzetti (Italy), and Gabriela Carrizo (Argentina), as well as with the film makers Giovanni Cioni (Italy) and Paco Aragón (Spain). He has been teaching Aesthetics of 20th century Music and Arts at the Institut Jaques-Dalcroze in Brussels since 1998, and is the conductor of the Black Jackets Ensemble since 2000.

Latin American career
In 1999, Tolosa taught a 20th-century music aesthetics seminar at the National University of Córdoba.

In 2000 he wrote, produced, directed, and hosted a series of twelve radio shows on contemporary music, La Odisea Musical del Siglo XX (The 20th Century Musical Odyssey), broadcast by  Nacional Córdoba. The same year, he made his debut with the Argentinian pianist Germán Náger as the Náger & Tolosa Piano Duo.

In 2001, he created the Cordoba Ensamble (a 20 musicians formation), and then the Laboratorio Contemporáneo del Córdoba Ensamble, acting as the musical director of both.

Tolosa began teaching composition and conducting at La Colmena, Córdoba, in 2002 and, since 2003, has been the artistic director of the Cordoba Contemporary Music Festival (Festival Internacional de Música Contemporánea de Córdoba).

Works

 Canción del Cronopio for bass trombone
 Y sacaréme la niebla for wind quintet
 El ángel se pudre for two violins
 Copper roses for twelve mixed voices a cappella
 Evaporo el otro que sigue caminando for bass clarinet
 A su imán for double bass, bass clarinet, and electronics
 Klavierkonzert for piano and live electronics
 L'endroit for soprano, violin, cello, double bass, and live electronics
 Obertura for eighteen musicians
 Canto II for sixteen musicians
 Estebnia for percussion and cd players
 Focos for clarinet and five cd players
 Piano Kit for piano
 Pentimento for two flutes
 Dimmi chi fosti for orchestra
 A rear window for cello and bass clarinet
 gente que canta de espaldas for eight solo voices
 Los vestigios for string quartet

References

External links
 MySpace page with extracts of compositions
 Náger & Tolosa Piano Duo MySpace page

Argentine classical composers
Argentine classical pianists
Argentine conductors (music)
Male conductors (music)
1966 births
Living people
Male classical composers
Musicians from Córdoba, Argentina
20th-century Argentine artists
21st-century Argentine artists
20th-century classical composers
21st-century classical composers
Male classical pianists
20th-century conductors (music)
21st-century conductors (music)
21st-century classical pianists
20th-century male musicians
21st-century male musicians